Podlesie  (German Schönwalde) is a village in the administrative district of Gmina Głuchołazy, within Nysa County, Opole Voivodeship, in south-western Poland, close to the Czech border. 

The village has a population of 310.

References

Podlesie